The 1968–69 Scottish Division One was won by Celtic by five points over nearest rival Rangers. Falkirk and Arbroath finished 17th and 18th respectively and were relegated to the 1969-70 Second Division.

League table

Results

See also
Nine in a row

References

League Tables

1968–69 Scottish Football League
Scottish Division One seasons
Scot